Borie may refer to:

USS Borie (DD-215), a Clemson-class destroyer in the United States Navy during World War II
USS Borie (DD-704), an Allen M. Sumner-class destroyer in the United States Navy

People with the surname
Adolph E. Borie (1809–1880), United States merchant and politician
André Borie (died 1971), French civil engineer
Françoise Borie (born 1947), French former swimmer
Philibert Borie (1759–1832), French physician and Mayor of Paris
Pierre Dumoulin-Borie (1808–1838), French Catholic missionary priest and member of the Paris Foreign Missions Society
Ryerson, Mrs. Emily Maria (née Borie) (1863–1939), American passenger who survived the sinking of RMS Titanic

See also

Bori (disambiguation)
Bory (disambiguation)